Vanessa Huppenkothen Labra is a Mexican model and television presenter for ESPN Deportes and ESPN Mexico.

Early life
The daughter of a Mexican mother and a German father, the football player Dieter Huppenkothen, she was born in Mexico City. She grew up in Mexico, but also often lived with her father in Duisburg. At that time, she attended Schalke 04 matches and is still an avowed fan of the Bundesliga club. She is fluent in German. After leaving school, Huppenkothen studied in Mexico City taking the subject International Relations. In an interview with German tabloid Bild, Huppenkothen mentioned that she chose this subject because she wanted to be the Mexico ambassador to Germany at that time. Her master's thesis was on FIFA.

Career
Parallel to her studies, she began modelling in 2007. Entering the initial rounds of the Miss Mexico National Contest, she became a Title Holder of the Nuestra Belleza Distrito Federal, and subsequently one of the only two designates from Distrito Federal, Mexico to the Miss Mexico National Contest 2007, where she was the final winner of the Miss Sports Award.

After a TV competition, she won a job as a sports journalist at the Mexican station Televisa Deportes. In 2008, she covered the 2008 Summer Olympic from Beijing. She appeared in a guest role in the 2008 TV series Noticiero Televisa Deportes. In 2010, she acted in iDespierta América!, and appeared as a reporter in Los Héroes del Norte in 2011.

She reported on the Mexico national football team during the 2010 FIFA World Cup in South Africa. For the 2014 FIFA World Cup in Brazil, she was again a presenter for Televisa's coverage of the Mexico national team, during which time she generated considerable attention, even coming amongst the top five searches in Singapore. She was featured as the cover feature model for GQ in June 2014 and Esquire in June 2013, GQ had earlier covered her in November 2012 and Esquire in November 2013.

After nine years in Televisa she left the network in March 2016, she moved to ESPN Mexico in July 2016.

Filmography
 2008: Noticiero Televisa Deportes
 2010: ¡Despierta América!
 2011: Los Héroes del Norte

References

External links
 
 Web site

Living people
21st-century Mexican actresses
Mexican female models
Mexican television presenters
Mexican people of German descent
Mexican people of Spanish descent
People from Mexico City
ESPN people
Mexican women television presenters
1984 births